Kxngeal Inlet is an inlet in the North Coast region of British Columbia, Canada, extending east from Grenville Channel opposite Pitt Island, to the north of Klewnuggit Inlet Marine Provincial Park. The inlet is considered part of the traditional territories of the Kitsumkalum, a Galts'ap of the Tsimshian Nation.

See also
Grenville Channel
Inside Passage
Klewnuggit Inlet Marine Provincial Park]

References

North Coast of British Columbia
Inlets of British Columbia